Rafael Jorge Magalhães Silva (born 14 November 1990) is a Portuguese cyclist, who currently rides for UCI Continental team .

Major results
2012
 1st Overall Volta a Portugal do Futuro
1st Stages 3 & 5
 1st Gran Premio Ciudad de Vigo I
 2nd Gran Premio Ciudad de Vigo II
 3rd Road race, National Under-23 Road Championships
2013
 1st Stages 1 & 3 Volta a Portugal do Futuro
2015
 8th Overall GP Liberty Seguros
2016
 5th Overall Volta ao Alentejo
2018
 3rd  Road race, Mediterranean Games
 7th Overall Grande Prémio de Portugal N2
2019
 1st Overall Volta a Albergaria
2020
 10th Prueba Villafranca-Ordiziako Klasika
 10th Overall Troféu Joaquim Agostinho
2022
 9th Clássica da Arrábida

References

External links

1990 births
Living people
Portuguese male cyclists
Sportspeople from Vila Nova de Gaia
Mediterranean Games bronze medalists for Portugal
Mediterranean Games medalists in cycling
Competitors at the 2018 Mediterranean Games
Cyclists at the 2019 European Games
European Games competitors for Portugal